The 1993 NCAA Division I Outdoor Track and Field Championships were contested June 2−5 at Tad Gormley Stadium at the University of New Orleans in New Orleans, Louisiana in order to determine the individual and team national champions of men's and women's collegiate Division I outdoor track and field events in the United States. 

These were the 71st annual men's championships and the 12th annual women's championships. This was the Privateers' first time hosting the event.

In a repeat of the previous year's result, Arkansas and LSU topped the men's and women's team standings, respectively; it was the Razorbacks' third men's team title and the seventh for the Lady Tigers. This was the second of eight consecutive titles for Arkansas. The Lady Tigers, meanwhile, captured their seventh consecutive title and, ultimately, the seventh of eleven straight titles they won between 1987 and 1997.

Individual results

Men's 100 meters
Only top eight final results shown; no prelims are listed
Wind=+1.69 mps

Men's 200 meters
Only top eight final results shown; no prelims are listed
Wind=+3.69 mps

Men's 400 meters
Only top eight final results shown; no prelims are listed

Men's 800 meters
Only top eight final results shown; no prelims are listed

Men's 1500 meters
Only top eight final results shown; no prelims are listed

Men's 3000 meters steeplechase
Only top eight final results shown; no prelims are listed

Men's 5000 meters
Only top eight final results shown; no prelims are listed

Men's 10,000 meters
Only top eight final results shown; no prelims are listed

Men's 110 meters hurdles
Only top eight final results shown; no prelims are listed
Wind=+1.51 mps

Men's 400 meters hurdles
Only top eight final results shown; no prelims are listed

Men's 4x100-meter relay
Only top eight final results shown; no prelims are listed

Men's 4x400-meter relay
Only top eight final results shown; no prelims are listed

Men's high jump
Only top eight final results shown; no prelims are listed

Men's pole vault
Only top eight final results shown; no prelims are listed

Men's long jump
Only top eight final results shown; no prelims are listed

Men's triple jump
Only top eight final results shown; no prelims are listed

Men's shot put
Only top eight final results shown; no prelims are listed

Men's discus throw
Only top eight final results shown; no prelims are listed

Men's hammer throw
Only top eight final results shown; no prelims are listed

Men's javelin throw
Only top eight final results shown; no prelims are listed

Men's decathlon
Only top eight final results shown; no prelims are listed

Women's 100 meters
Only top eight final results shown; no prelims are listed
Wind=+0.33 mps

Women's 200 meters
Only top eight final results shown; no prelims are listed
Wind=+1.58 mps

Women's 400 meters
Only top eight final results shown; no prelims are listed

Women's 800 meters
Only top eight final results shown; no prelims are listed

Women's 1500 meters
Only top eight final results shown; no prelims are listed

Women's 3000 meters
Only top eight final results shown; no prelims are listed

Women's 5000 meters
Only top eight final results shown; no prelims are listed

Women's 10,000 meters
Only top eight final results shown; no prelims are listed

Women's 100 meters hurdles
Only top eight final results shown; no prelims are listed
Wind=+2.38 mps

Women's 400 meters hurdles
Only top eight final results shown; no prelims are listed

Women's 4x100-meter relay
Only top eight final results shown; no prelims are listed

Women's 4x400-meter relay
Only top eight final results shown; no prelims are listed

Women's high jump
Only top eight final results shown; no prelims are listed

Women's long jump
Only top eight final results shown; no prelims are listed

Women's triple jump
Only top eight final results shown; no prelims are listed

Women's shot put
Only top eight final results shown; no prelims are listed

Women's discus throw
Only top eight final results shown; no prelims are listed

Women's javelin throw
Only top eight final results shown; no prelims are listed

Women's heptathlon
Only top eight final results shown; no prelims are listed

Team results 
 Note: Top 10 only
 (H) = Hosts
Full results

Men's standings

Women's standings

References

NCAA Men's Outdoor Track and Field Championship
NCAA Division I Outdoor Track and Field Championships
NCAA
NCAA Division I Outdoor Track and Field Championships
NCAA Women's Outdoor Track and Field Championship